Buffalo City Hall is the seat for municipal government in the City of Buffalo, New York. Located at 65 Niagara Square, the 32-story Art Deco building was completed in 1931 by Dietel, Wade & Jones.

The  building is one of the largest and tallest municipal buildings in the United States and is also one of the tallest buildings in Western New York. It was designed by chief architect John Wade with the assistance of George Dietel. The friezes were sculpted by Albert Stewart and the sculpture executed by Rene Paul Chambellan. The foyer features a bronze tablet honoring Mayor Roesch, created in 1937 by regional sculptor, William Ehrich.

Buffalo City Hall was listed on the National Register of Historic Places in 1999. It is located within the Joseph Ellicott Historic District.

History

Previous buildings

In 1851, the city bought the property at the northwest corner of Church and Franklin streets in Buffalo to be used for the Mayor's office and other city offices. On this site, and constructed between 1871 and 1875, the city built a monumental granite structure designed by Rochester architect Andrew Jackson Warner (1833–1910).  The building, now known as the  Old County Hall, has four floors and a large, seven-story clock tower. It held offices for both the City of Buffalo and Erie County.

In 1920, the Buffalo Common Council decided, in light of the fact that the population of the city had quadrupled since the construction of County and City Hall forty-five years earlier, that a new building was needed to house the city government of Buffalo. Niagara Square was chosen as it is one of the central components of Joseph Ellicott's original plan of 1804, laid out for the City of Buffalo. From this location, one can see the waterways of Lake Erie and the shores of Ontario in Canada as well as the rest of downtown Buffalo.  On September 16, 1929, construction of the new City Hall began and the building was ultimately completed on November 10, 1931 with the dedication taking place the following summer, on July 1, 1932, commemorating the city's Centennial celebration.

When the new City Hall opened and the city offices moved to the present building, the former 1875 County and City Hall became Erie County court offices. It is also the home of the Erie County Clerk's office, where important county records are kept.  The former  county and city hall was listed on the National Register of Historic Places in 1976.

Construction

City Hall was built by the John W. Cowper Company, the same firm who built the Statler Hotel and the Buffalo Athletic Club, also on Niagara Square. The cost of building City Hall was $6,851,546.85 ($ in  dollars) including the architect's fees, making it one of the costliest city halls in the country.

City Hall has 32 stories, 26 of which offer usable office space. There are 1,520 windows from the first to the 25th floor. A practical design feature is that all of them open inward, making window washers unnecessary. There are eight elevators to the 13th floor and four to the 25th floor. Curtis Elevator Company furnished the first elevators, with additional elevators supplied later by Otis Elevator Company.

There are 5,000 electrical outlets, 5,400 electrical switches and 21 motor driven ventilation fans. There are either 138 or 143 clocks (counts vary) regulated by a master clock in the basement and 37 fire alarm stations distributed throughout the building.

It was originally equipped with 375 telephones and a master switchboard. External illumination was provided from dusk to midnight by 369 flood lights with an average candlepower of 350.

City Hall was designed and built with a non-powered air-conditioning system, taking advantage of strong prevailing winds from Lake Erie. Large vents were placed on the west side of the building to catch wind, which would then travel down ducts to beneath the basement, to be cooled by the ground. This cooled air was then vented throughout the building. Winds off the lake were usually strong enough to power air through this system.

In the summer of 2006, Buffalo City Hall started undergoing renovations from the 13th floor all the way to the top as the flood lights were replaced; three years later, it was the south wing that started undergoing renovations of its own. Renovations were completed by 2009.

In popular culture 
In the American television series Avenue 5, Buffalo City Hall is the new White House.

Folklore

In 2018, an urban legend emerged, claiming that a fire broke out at City Hall at an unspecified time in the 19th or 20th centuries and all of the records that were housed in there at the time had been destroyed. Local historians later debunked the claim as false.

Gallery

See also
List of tallest buildings in Buffalo

References

External links

City of Buffalo

Buffalo As an Architectural Museum: Buffalo City Hall

Architecture of Buffalo, New York
Buildings and structures in Buffalo, New York
Skyscraper office buildings in Buffalo, New York
Government buildings completed in 1931
City and town halls on the National Register of Historic Places in New York (state)
Government of Buffalo, New York
Historic American Buildings Survey in New York (state)
Tourist attractions in Buffalo, New York
1930s architecture in the United States
Art Deco architecture in New York (state)
National Register of Historic Places in Buffalo, New York